The Encyclopedia of Unusual Sex Practices is a reference book by Brenda Love, first published in 1992, and republished many times.

Description
The book describes a huge number of human sexual practices, many of which are either uncommon or regarded as taboo in many cultures. Many of the topics covered are related to paraphilia of various kinds. The book includes over 700 entries and 150 illustrations.

The Encyclopedia of Unusual Sex Practices is the only mainstream reference available on many of these topics.  It has also been published in Spanish, Portuguese, Japanese, German and French.

See also
Human sexuality
Human sexual behavior
Paraphilia
Sexual fetishism

References

External links
 Glossary of clinical sexology (it - en)

Sexology literature
Encyclopedias of sexuality